Litaneutria pacifica is a species of praying mantis found in North America.

References

pacifica
Mantodea of North America
Insects described in 1896